Artes mechanicae (mechanical arts) are a medieval concept of ordered practices or skills, often juxtaposed to the traditional seven liberal arts (artes liberales). Also called "servile" and "vulgar", from antiquity they had been deemed unbecoming for a free man, as ministering to baser needs.

Overview
Johannes Scotus Eriugena (9th century) divides them   into seven parts: 
  (tailoring, weaving)
  (agriculture)
  (architecture, masonry)
  (trade)
  (cooking)
  (blacksmithing, metallurgy)

In his Didascalicon, Hugh of St Victor (12th century) includes navigation, medicine and theatrical arts instead of commerce, agriculture and cooking. Hugh's treatment somewhat elevates the mechanical arts as ordained to the improvement of humanity, a promotion which was to represent a growing trend among late medievals.

In the 19th century, "mechanic arts" referred to some of the  fields that are now known as engineering.  Use of the term was apparently an attempt to distinguish these fields from creative and artistic endeavors like the performing arts and the fine arts, which were for the upper class of the time, and the intelligentsia.  The mechanic arts were also considered practical fields for those that did not come from good families.

Related phrases, "useful arts" or "applied arts" probably encompass the mechanic arts as well as craftsmanship in general.

The most famous usage of the term "mechanic arts" (and the one in which it is most commonly encountered today) is in the Morrill Land-Grant Colleges Act.

See also 
Artes liberales
Medieval technology

Footnotes

References
Walton, S.A., An Introduction to the Mechanical Arts in the Middle Ages, AVISTA, University of Toronto, 2003

Applied sciences
Visual arts media
History of engineering
The arts
Medieval European education